Emmanuel Chukwuma  is an Anglican archbishop in Nigeria. He is the current bishop of the Diocese of Enugu and the archbishop of the Anglican Province of Enugu. He has been the Archbishop since 2014.

Chukwuma was born in Asaba on 15 January 1954. After secondary school he trained to be a teacher. He then graduated in Theology from Immanuel College of Theology, Ibadan.  He was ordained in 1981 and served his title at Christ Church, Ibadan. He has also served as Chaplain to the Archbishop of Nigeria His Grace, Most Rev'd Timothy Olufosoye, the first Primate of the Church of Nigeria;  Vicar of St. Paul, Ibadan; and as Bishop of Bauchi.

He was elected as Archbishop of Enugu at the 11th General Synod of the Church of Nigeria, held at the Cathedral Church of the Good Shepherd, Enugu, in September 2014.

Notes

1954 births
People from Delta State
Living people
Nigerian Anglicans
Anglican bishops of Bauchi
Anglican bishops of Enugu
Anglican archbishops of Enugu
21st-century Anglican bishops in Nigeria
Alumni of Immanuel College of Theology, Ibadan
Igbo people